Espy Van Horne (1795 – August 25, 1829) was a member of the United States House of Representatives from Pennsylvania.

Espy Van Horne was born in Lycoming County, Pennsylvania.  He was elected to the Nineteenth and Twentieth Congresses.  He died in Williamsport, Pennsylvania, in 1829.

External links
The Political Graveyard

 

1795 births
1829 deaths
People from Lycoming County, Pennsylvania
American people of Dutch descent
Members of the Pennsylvania House of Representatives
Politicians from Williamsport, Pennsylvania
Jacksonian members of the United States House of Representatives from Pennsylvania
19th-century American politicians